Hubert Edward Hinchman (November 12, 1907 – January 9, 1968) was an American football player. He played college football at Butler and professional football in the National Football League (NFL) as a back for the Chicago Cardinals in 1933 and 1934 and the Detroit Lions in 1934. He appeared in 22 NFL games, six as a starter. He served in the Navy during World War II and worked for Delco-Remy after the war. He died in Anderson, Indiana, in 1968.

References

1907 births
1968 deaths
Butler Bulldogs football players
Chicago Cardinals players
Detroit Lions players
Players of American football from Illinois